Luitpold Braun (born August 11, 1950) is a German politician, representative of the Christian Social Union of Bavaria. From 1996 to 2008 he was chairman of the Weilheim-Schongau. In the CSU, he was chairman of the Association of Municipal Affairs and member of the party executive.

See also
List of Bavarian Christian Social Union politicians

References

Christian Social Union in Bavaria politicians
1950 births
Living people